Stathmopoda coracodes is a moth of the family Stathmopodidae. It was described by Edward Meyrick in 1923. It is found in New Zealand.

References

 Stathmopoda coracodes in insectin

Moths described in 1923
Stathmopodidae
Endemic fauna of New Zealand
Taxa named by Edward Meyrick
Moths of New Zealand
Endemic moths of New Zealand